Newnhamia is a genus of ostracods. It contains five species, four of which are endemic to Australia and surrounding islands (including New Zealand and New Caledonia), while a fifth was described in 2003 from Kerala, India. Two species from South America, described as species of Newnhamia, do not appear to be closely related to the remaining species, and probably belong in a different genus. N. fuscata and N. insolita are both listed as vulnerable species on the IUCN Red List.

Newnhamia dumonti George & Martens, 2003
Newnhamia fenestrata King, 1855
Newnhamia fuscata (Brady, 1886)
Newnhamia insolita De Deckker, 1979
Newnhamia petiola De Deckker, 1979

References

External links

Podocopida genera
Notodromadidae
Taxonomy articles created by Polbot